In the study of the arithmetic of elliptic curves, the j-line over a ring R is the coarse moduli scheme attached to the moduli problem sending a ring  to the set of isomorphism classes of elliptic curves over . Since elliptic curves over the complex numbers are isomorphic (over an algebraic closure) if and only if their -invariants agree, the affine space  parameterizing j-invariants of elliptic curves yields a coarse moduli space. However, this fails to be a fine moduli space due to the presence of elliptic curves with automorphisms, necessitating the construction of the Moduli stack of elliptic curves.

This is related to the congruence subgroup  in the following way:

 

The j-line can be seen as giving a coordinatization of the classical modular curve of level 1, which is isomorphic to the complex projective line .

References

Moduli theory
Elliptic curves